Philactis is a genus of Mexican plants in the tribe Heliantheae within the family Asteraceae.

 Species
 Philactis fayi A.M.Torres - Michoacán
 Philactis nelsonii (Greenm.) S.F.Blake - Chiapas, Oaxaca
 Philactis zinnioides Schrad. - Chiapas, Oaxaca, Michoacán, Hidalgo

 formerly included
see Heliopsis 
 Philactis longipes A.Gray - Heliopsis longipes (A.Gray) S.F.Blake

References

Heliantheae
Asteraceae genera
Endemic flora of Mexico